Santa Terezinha is a city  in the state of Pernambuco, Brazil. The population in 2020, according with IBGE was 11,865 inhabitants and the total area is 200.32 km².

Geography

 State - Pernambuco
 Region - Sertão Pernambucano
 Boundaries - Paraiba state  and Brejinho   (N);  São José do Egito and Tabira    (S);  São José do Egito   (E);   Tabira    (W).
 Area - 195.58 km²
 Elevation - 813 m
 Hydrography - Pajeú River
 Vegetation - Caatinga
 Climate - Semi arid and tropical hot
 Annual average temperature - 21.7 c
 Distance to Recife - 429.5 km

Economy

The main economic activities in Santa Terezinha are based in agribusiness, especially creation of cattle, sheep, pigss, goats, chickens;  and plantations of beans, corn and manioc.

Economic Indicators

Economy by Sector
2006

Health Indicators

References

Municipalities in Pernambuco